Bathysa is a genus of flowering plants in the family Rubiaceae. It was described by Carl Borivoj Presl in 1845. The genus is found from Venezuela south to Brazil and Bolivia.

Species 
Species currently (April 2014) accepted:

 Bathysa australis (A.St.-Hil.) K.Schum. - Bolivia, Brazil
 Bathysa bathysoides (Steyerm.) Delprete - Venezuela, Bolivia, Colombia, Perú, Brazil 
 Bathysa gymnocarpa K.Schum. - Brazil (States of Rio de Janeiro, São Paulo)
 Bathysa mendoncae K.Schum. - Brazil
 Bathysa multiflora L.O.Williams - Perú
 Bathysa nicholsonii K.Schum. - Brazil
 Bathysa perijaensis (Steyerm.) Delprete - Venezuela
 Bathysa pittieri (Standl.) Steyerm. - Venezuela
 Bathysa stipulata (Vell.) C.Presl - Brazil
 Bathysa sylvestrae Germano-Filho & M.Gomes - Brazil (State of Rio de Janeiro)

References

External links 
 Bathysa in the World Checklist of Rubiaceae

Dialypetalantheae
Flora of northern South America
Flora of western South America
Flora of Brazil
Rubiaceae genera
Taxa named by Carl Borivoj Presl